Casa de Laga Plantation was a forced-labor farm of  located in west central Leon County, Florida, United States established by George Alexander Croom. It was also known as the Ball and McCabe Place and later as Shidzuoka. In 1860, 70 enslaved people worked the land, which was primarily devoted to producing cotton as a cash crop.

Location
Casa de Laga was located along the southwest shores of Lake Jackson. Today the plantation's grounds are the neighborhoods surrounding Harriet Drive, Longview Drive, Faulk Drive, Shady Oaks Drive, and slightly across N. Monroe Street or U.S. Highway 27.

1860 plantation specifics
The Leon County Florida 1860 Agricultural Census shows that the Casa de Laga Plantation had the following:
 Improved Land: 
 Unimproved Land: 
 Cash value of plantation: $15,000
 Cash value of farm implements/machinery: $500
 Cash value of farm animals: $5850
 Number of slaves: 70
 Bushels of corn: 3,000
 Bales of cotton: 200

Croom had 96 head of cattle, 100 sheep and 100 swine. He also produced 200 pounds of wool and slaughtered livestock valued at $3000.

Owners
George Alexander Croom, was born October 7, 1821. He married Julia M. Church, who was the daughter of Alonzo Church, the sixth president of the University of Georgia in Athens on February 13, 1843. George Alexander Croom was the father of Alonzo Church Croom, Comptroller of the State of Florida from 1900 until his death on December 7, 1912 and  the brother of Hardy Bryan Croom, a planter and recognized naturalist, who discovered the rare Florida torreya tree and established Goodwood Plantation. He died July 5, 1890.

In 1883 Casa de Laga was sold to H. D. McColloch of Wisconsin. McColloch then sold the plantation 6 months later to Professor E. Warren Clark of Narragansett Pier, Rhode Island and Austn M. Purvis of Philadelphia. Clark would eventually turn the plantation into a game preserve. In 1891, a Charles T. Wilson of Cincinnati opened the Lake Jackson Hunting Lodge on the property.

See also
 Plantations of Leon County, Florida

Further reading
 Paisley, Clifton. From Cotton To Quail, University of Florida Press, c1968.

External links
 Rootsweb Plantations 
 Largest Slaveholders from 1860 Slave Census Schedules

Plantations in Leon County, Florida
Cotton plantations in Florida